Kakuna is a village in Saaremaa Parish, Saare County, on the eastern part of Saaremaa Island, Estonia.

Before the administrative reform in 2017, the village was in Pöide Parish.

References 

Villages in Saare County